The 2017 Men's EuroHockey Indoor Club Cup was the 28th edition of the Men's EuroHockey Indoor Club Cup, Europe's premier club indoor hockey tournament organized by the EHF. It was held from 10 to 12 February 2017 in the Wiener Stadthalle in Vienna, Austria.

Uhlenhorst Mülheim won their second title by defeating the hosts Arminen 3–2 in the final, Amsterdam took the bronze medal and Grunwald Poznań and Partille were relegated to the Trophy division.

Teams
Participating clubs have qualified based on their country's final ranking from the 2016 competition (Host is highlighted in bold).

Results
All times are local, CET (UTC+1).

Preliminary round

Pool A

Pool B

Fifth to eighth place classification

Pool C
The points obtained in the preliminary round against the other team are taken over.

First to fourth place classification

Semi-finals

Third place game

Final

Statistics

Final standings

Top goalscorers

See also
2016–17 Euro Hockey League

References

Men's EuroHockey Indoor Club Cup
Club Cup Men
International indoor hockey competitions hosted by Austria
EuroHockey Indoor Club Cup Men
Sports competitions in Vienna
EuroHockey Indoor Club Cup Men
2010s in Vienna